is a garden in Hakata-ku, Fukuoka, Japan. It was originally built in 1906 for Shimozawa Zenemon Chikamasa, a Hakata merchant. In 1995, Fukuoka City overhauled the structure and reopened it as a Japanese garden where visitors can experience a tea ceremony; with four tea rooms (two of which are available for use by general visitors) it is often used for tea ceremonies and related training.

See also
Yūsentei Park

External links
  
 Yokanavi.com 

Geography of Fukuoka
Gardens in Fukuoka Prefecture
Gardens in Japan
Tourist attractions in Fukuoka